Chao is a town in Northern Peru, capital of the district of Chao in the region La Libertad. This town is located about 65 km south of Trujillo. Chao is primarily an agricultural center in the Chao Valley.

See also
Chavimochic
Virú Valley
Virú
Moche valley

References

Populated places in La Libertad Region